Nedzhmi Ali (born 16 July 1972 in Dzhebel, Bulgaria) is a Bulgarian politician of Bulgarian-Turkish descent and Member of the European Parliament (MEP). He is a member of the Movement for Rights and Freedoms, part of the Alliance of Liberals and Democrats for Europe.

Biography

Ali became a Member of the European Parliament of 2004–9 with effect from 1 January 2007 upon the accession of Bulgaria to the European Union.

In 2013 he was appointed to the post of Bulgarian Vice-minister of Defence.

In May 2014 he returned to the European Parliament as an elected MEP. He currently sits on the Committee on Budgets and the Committee on Budgetary Control.

References

External links
European Parliament profile
European Parliament official photo

1972 births
Living people
Bulgarian people of Turkish descent
Movement for Rights and Freedoms MEPs
MEPs for Bulgaria 2007
MEPs for Bulgaria 2014–2019
University of National and World Economy alumni